Douglas Thomas (born 1966) is an American scholar, researcher, and journalist.  He is Associate Professor at the Annenberg School for Communication at the University of Southern California where he studies technology, communication, and culture.  He is author or editor of numerous books including Reading Nietzsche Rhetorically (Guilford, 1998), Cybercrime: Security and Surveillance in the Information Age (with Brian Loader, Routledge, 2000), Hacker Culture (University of Minnesota Press, 2002), and Technological Visions: The Hopes and Fears that Shape New Technologies (with Marita Sturken and Sandra Ball-Rokeach).  He has published numerous articles in academic journals and is the founding editor of Games and Culture: A Journal of Interactive Media.

In 1998 and 1999, he covered the case of Kevin Mitnick for Wired News.  On July 24, 2002, he testified before Congress on the topic of Cyber Terrorism and Critical Infrastructure Protection.

His research has been funded by the Annenberg Center for Communication, the Richard Lounsbery Foundation, and the MacArthur Foundation and has focused on the relationship between virtual worlds and civic engagement and digital media and learning.

His 2008 article co-authored with John Seely Brown, "The Gamer Disposition", was named a Harvard Business Review Breakthrough Idea of 2008, and also featured it on its Conversation Starter blog.

Thomas co-authored A New Culture of Learning: Cultivating the Imagination for a World of Constant Change which was translated into Turkish.

References

1966 births
Living people
American male journalists
University of Minnesota alumni
University of Southern California faculty
People associated with computer security